By 1913, the British Empire held sway over 412 million people,  of the world population at the time.

Population

The following table gives the population of the British Empire and its territories, in several different time periods. The most populous territory in the empire was British India, which included what are now Pakistan and Bangladesh.

Ethnicity
The empire's population was classified into white people, also referred to as Europeans, and non-white people, variously referred to as persons of color, negros and natives. The largest ethnic grouping in the empire was Indians (including what are now Pakistanis and Bangladeshis), who were classified into 118 groups on the basis of language which were amalgamated into seven "principle groups". The following table gives the population figures for white people and non-white people, in the empire and its territories, in 1814 and 1901.

Religion
The British authorities were primarily Protestant Christians throughout the history of the Empire.

The following table gives the population figures for the religions in the British Empire in 1901. The most populous religion in the empire was Hinduism, followed by Islam.

See also
Economy of the British Empire
Territorial evolution of the British Empire

References

Further reading

 

British Empire
History of the British Empire